is a song recorded by Japanese-American singer-songwriter Ai. It was originally released on January 5, 2016, by EMI Records, as a promotional single.

Upon its release, the song was a sleeper hit, peaking at number 4 on the Billboard Japan Hot 100 and later received a Platinum certification from the Recording Industry Association of Japan in January 2016 while the full version received a Gold certification. The song was later included in a deluxe reissue of Ai's second greatest hits album, The Best.

Background and release 
Written by Makoto Shinohara, "Minna ga Minna ga Eiyū" was originally planned to only be used in a promotional campaign for au, a Japanese mobile phone operator. A 100-second version of the song was exclusively released on au's music services in January 2016, and a few weeks later was released to other digital stores. In February 2016, Universal Japan announced the full version of the song was to be released to digital stores.

With the release of the full version of the song as a single, "Minna ga Minna ga Eiyū" became a sleeper hit in Japan with over 400,000 downloads. In April 2016, the song was certified Gold by the RIAJ.

Composition and lyrics 
A J-pop song, "Minna ga Minna ga Eiyū" samples the melody of "Do Your Ears Hang Low?", a children's song often sung in schools and camps. Lyrically, the song is about being a hero. Real Sound Japan described the song as an "uplifting J-pop song" with "soulful singing" from Ai.

Live performances 
Ai performed "Minna ga Minna ga Eiyū" at the 67th NHK Kōhaku Uta Gassen.

Track listing 
All tracks written by Makoto Shinohara and produced by Uta.

Charts

Credits and personnel 
Credits adapted from Tidal.

 Ai Uemura – vocals
 Uta – producer, recording arranger
 Makoto Shinohara – songwriter
 Traditional – composer

Certifications

Release history

References 

2016 songs
2016 singles
Ai (singer) songs
EMI Records singles
Universal Music Japan singles
Universal Music Group singles
Songs based on children's songs